Rasul Abakar oghlu Chunayev is an Azerbaijani Greco-Roman wrestler. He was born 7 January 1991 in Yeni Şərif, Balakən, Azerbaijan, to Avar parents. He is a world champion and European vice-champion in men's Greco-Roman wrestling.

Career
In 2015, he won gold medal at 2015 European Games and became the first athlete to win gold while being on active duty for Azerbaijani Armed Forces.

Personal life
Chunayev loves dancing. His character is frequently described as laid-back and relaxed. His most notable celebration came after Chunayev defeated Russian wrestler Islambek Albiev at the 2013 Summer Universiade, when he performed the Lezginka, a traditional dance of the Caucacus, on the mat. He also gave a military salute as a sign of respect to the Azerbaijani families of victims in Karabakh after defeating Armenian wrestler Varsham Boranyan during 2014 World Wrestling Championships in Tashkent.

References

External links
 

Living people
1991 births
Azerbaijani people of Avar descent
People from Balakən
European Games gold medalists for Azerbaijan
European Games medalists in wrestling
Wrestlers at the 2015 European Games
Azerbaijani male sport wrestlers
World Wrestling Championships medalists
Wrestlers at the 2016 Summer Olympics
Olympic wrestlers of Azerbaijan
Medalists at the 2016 Summer Olympics
Olympic medalists in wrestling
Olympic bronze medalists for Azerbaijan
Universiade medalists in wrestling
Universiade gold medalists for Azerbaijan
European Wrestling Championships medalists
Medalists at the 2013 Summer Universiade
Islamic Solidarity Games medalists in wrestling
Islamic Solidarity Games competitors for Azerbaijan